The Asso X Jewel is an all - wood, low wing, single engine, two tandem seats ultralight aircraft, designed by Italian designer Giuseppe Vidor.

This aircraft is one of his many wooden designs, marketed by Vidor's Asso Aerei company, like the Asso V Champion, Asso IV Whisky and Asso VI Junior. The aircraft kit/plans are specified for the Rotax 912, but it is also one of the very few aircraft reported to be using the Sauer S 2100 ULT engine.

Variants
Millennium Master
A composite airplane, evolved from the Asso X Jewel.

Pelegrin Tarragon
A composite airplane, evolved from the Millennium Master.

Blackshape Prime
A composite airplane, evolved from the Millennium Master.

Specifications

References

Asso X Jewel
2000s Italian sport aircraft
Low-wing aircraft
Single-engined tractor aircraft